"Twinkle, Twinkle Lucky Star" is a song co-written and recorded by American country music artist Merle Haggard backed by The Strangers.  It was released in November 1987 as the first single from the album Chill Factor.  The song was the last of Haggard's thirty-four number one singles as a solo artist.  The single went to number one for one week and spent fifteen weeks on the country chart.  Haggard wrote the song with Freddy Powers.

Charts

Weekly charts

Year-end charts

References
 

1987 singles
Merle Haggard songs
Songs written by Merle Haggard
Epic Records singles
Songs written by Freddy Powers
1987 songs